Lenore Aubert (born Eleonore Maria Leisner, April 18, 1913  – July 31, 1993) was a model and Hollywood actress best known for her movie roles as exotic, mysterious women.

Early years 
Aubert was born in what is now Celje, Austro-Hungarian Empire. She grew up in Vienna.

Career 
In New York, she found work as a model and was eventually offered a stage role as Lorraine Sheldon in The Man Who Came to Dinner at the La Jolla Playhouse in San Diego. She began her U.S. film career in the early 1940s, taking the French-sounding screen name Lenore Aubert.

She was professionally pursued by Louis B. Mayer, to be put under a seven year contract to Metro Goldwyn-Mayer, however Samuel Goldwyn, with whom she was already under contract, refused to sell her contract to M.G.M.

Her European accent limited her choice of roles, and she played such parts as a Nazi spy and a French war bride. She was most fond of her role in the 1947 film I Wonder Who's Kissing Her Now, playing glamorous entertainer Fritzi Barrington. Her best-known role was as Dr. Sandra Mornay, a beautiful but sinister scientist, in the 1948 horror-comedy Abbott and Costello Meet Frankenstein.

On June 4, 1950, Aubert co-starred in "People vs. William Tait", an episode of the television court show Famous Jury Trials.

Later years 
Aubert's film career was basically over by the end of the 1940s. She and her husband then moved back to New York City, starting a garment business. A few years later, the couple divorced. She went back to Europe, only to return to the United States in 1959.

She did volunteer work for the United Nations Activities and Housing Section and the Museum of Natural History. In 1983, she suffered a stroke, which eventually impaired her memory.

Much of Aubert's life after her film career is known from a personal interview in August 1987 by Jim McPherson (1938-2002) of the Toronto Sun. He was editor of the Sun'''s TV listings magazine from its launch in 1973 until his retirement in 1994.

 Personal life 
Aubert was married to Julius Altman, who was Jewish, and the couple fled Austria after the Anschluss'' to escape Nazi persecution. They moved to the United States after spending time in Paris.

She returned to the United States as the wife of millionaire Milton Greene. They divorced in 1974.

Death 
Aubert died on the morning of July 31, 1993 at age 80 in Great Neck, New York.

Filmography

Notes

References

External links
 
 

American stage actresses
American film actresses
Emigrants from Austria to the United States after the Anschluss
20th-century American actresses
1913 births
1993 deaths